Theresa Elizabeth (Chandler) White Weasel Walker Lamebull (April 19, 1896? – August 10, 2007) was reputedly  a supercentenarian believed to have been the oldest living member of the Gros Ventre Tribe of Montana and possibly the oldest Native American ever recorded. Her Indian name was "Kills At Night" (BeeKanHay).

Lamebull's family hadn't known exactly how old she was until some time around 2005 when they found a baptismal certificate which may be hers. A priest translated the Latin on the certificate as saying she was a year old when she was baptised in 1897.

Lamebull was a fluent speaker of the Gros Ventre language, spoken by only a handful of other people. She helped teaching the language at Fort Belknap College, and contributed to a dictionary using the Phraselator when she was 109.

The Hays Education Resource Center on the Fort Belknap Reservation was named the 'Kills At Night Center' in her honor and at the naming ceremony Terry Brockie, an A'aninin (Gros Ventres) language teacher sang her a traditional song in the A'aninin language.

She died in August 2007 at the claimed age of 111. A funeral Mass was held at St. Paul's Catholic Gymnasium in Hays, Montana, and she was buried at Mission Cemetery.

References

Direct Conversation, Ivy Merriot, Director, Abaetern Academy, Bozeman, MT 9/5/2007
Direct Conversation, Marlene Werk, Director, Hays Education Resource Center (Kills At Night Center), Hays, Montana 2006
Direct Conversation, Sister Chris, St. Paul's Mission School, Hays, Montana 2005

2007 deaths
American supercentenarians
Schoolteachers from Montana
American women educators
Longevity claims
20th-century Native Americans
People from Blaine County, Montana
Last known speakers of a Native American language
Gros Ventre people
People from Fort Belknap Indian Reservation
20th-century American women
20th-century Native American women
21st-century Native Americans
21st-century Native American women